Antwan Tabari Lake (born July 10, 1979) is a former American football defensive tackle. He was signed by the Detroit Lions as an undrafted free agent in 2002. He played college football at West Virginia.

Lake has also played for the Atlanta Falcons and New Orleans Saints.

College career
Antwan Lake enrolled at West Virginia University in 1998. He played outside linebacker his freshman season, recording 9 tackles, a forced fumble, a fumble recovery, and 3 sacks.

As a sophomore, in 1999, Lake shifted to defensive tackle. That season, he totaled 39 tackles and three sacks. As a junior, 2000, hr only recorded 13 tackles and one sack. In his final season, 2001, hr recorded 26 tackles and 3 sacks. In his career, the three-year starter totaled 87 tackles, 10 sacks, and 15 tackles-for-a-loss.

Professional career

Detroit Lions
After being undrafted in the 2002 NFL Draft, Antwan Lake joined the Detroit Lions. He played in nine games as a rookie, recording two tackles.

Atlanta Falcons
After his rookie season with Detroit, Lake was signed by the Atlanta Falcons on December 21, 2003. He did not see playing time for the rest of the 2003 season.

In 2004, Lake played in every game on the season. He recorded 17 tackles and deflected a pass on the season.

In 2005, Antwan Lake recorded 21 tackles, 3.5 sacks, two forced fumbles, and a safety while playing in 13 games on the season.

New Orleans Saints
After being cut from Atlanta in 2005, Lake was picked up by the New Orleans Saints in 2006. He played in 15 games that season, totaling 15 tackles, one sack, and a pass deflection.

In 2007, Lake totaled 18 tackles, one sack, and four safeties.

External links
Just Sports Stats

1979 births
Living people
People from Cambridge, Maryland
People from Seaford, Delaware
American football defensive tackles
West Virginia Mountaineers football players
Detroit Lions players
Atlanta Falcons players
New Orleans Saints players
Las Vegas Locomotives players